The Aerostar R40S Festival is a Romanian made ultralight and light-sport aircraft, designed and produced by Aerostar of Bacău. The aircraft is supplied as a complete ready-to-fly-aircraft.

Design and development
The aircraft was designed to comply with the Fédération Aéronautique Internationale microlight, and US light-sport aircraft rules. It features a cantilever low-wing, a two-seats-in-side-by-side configuration enclosed cockpit, fixed tricycle landing gear and a single engine in tractor configuration.

The aircraft is made from aluminum sheet. Its  span wing employs manually operated flaps. The standard engine is the  Rotax 912ULS four-stroke powerplant, driving a three-bladed Woodcomp propeller.

Variants
R40F
Initial ultralight model
R40FS
Improved model
R40S
Base model with dial instruments
R40S-GC
Version for IFR flight, with a Dynon Skyview glass cockpit

Operators

Mozambique Air Force

Specifications (R40F/FS Festival)

References

External links

1990s Romanian ultralight aircraft
Light-sport aircraft
Single-engined tractor aircraft